The Littlest Hobo is a Canadian television series (French title: Le Vagabond) based upon a 1958 well-known film of the same name directed by Charles R. Rondeau. The series first aired from 1963 to 1965 in syndication, and was revived for a popular second run on CTV, spanning six seasons, from October 11, 1979, to March 7, 1985. The concept of the show was that of "an ownerless dog".

All three productions revolved around an extremely intelligent stray German Shepherd, the titular Hobo, who wanders from town to town, helping people in need. Although the concept (of a dog saving the day) was perhaps similar to that of Lassie and/or Rin Tin Tin, the Littlest Hobo's destiny was to befriend those who apparently needed help (all portrayed by actors in celebrity guest appearance roles). Despite the attempts of the many people whom he helped to adopt him, he appeared to prefer to be on his own, and would head off by himself at the end of each episode.

Referred to as “Gulliver” in a single episode, the dog is often referred to by the name Hobo or by the names given by temporary human companions. His origins, motivation, and ultimate destination are never explained on screen.

1963–1965 series
The German Shepherd dogs featured in both 1960s and 1980s series were owned and trained by Charles (Chuck) P. Eisenmann. The primary star was named London, but several of London's relatives, including Toro, Litlon, and Thorn, also played scenes as the Hobo. Eisenmann used his own training methods to work with his dogs which involved educating them to think and understand very specific directions, to recognize colours, and to understand English, German, and French. He promoted his education method by touring with his dogs to offer live demonstrations,  appearing on TV and radio shows and by writing books. Eisenmann recounts many stories from the filming of the series in his 1968 dog training book Stop! Sit! and Think. Other books he wrote include The Better Dog: The Educated Dog which contains updated training material and A Dog’s Day in Court which offers a dog's point of view towards training methods.

The dogs have "reverse mask" markings. After purchasing London, Eisenmann began to breed his own dogs, mostly studding out his males, even though he owned some females that he bred to as well. He bred particularly for the reverse mask, that is commonly seen on all of his dogs, and is unpopular with breeders of the German Shepherd, as it is not in the breed standard.

Shiloh Shepherd dogs are stated to trace their heritage back to London's relatives and are inspired by the intelligence Eisenmann's dogs were reputed to have.

Some notable Hollywood guest stars included Pat Harrington Jr., Nita Talbot, Ellen Corby, Henry Gibson, and Keenan Wynn (the last two of which would also guest-star in the 1979–1985 revival series).

1979–1985 series

In 1979 CTV revived the series. The New Littlest Hobo (as it was sometimes called), which ran for six seasons, was shot on videotape rather than film. It has since been syndicated in many countries including the US and UK. In the course of its run, a mixture of well-known Canadian and Hollywood guest stars appeared such as Al Waxman, Carol Lynley, John Ireland, Megan Follows, Rex Hagon, Alan Hale Jr., Jack Gilford, August Schellenberg, DeForest Kelley, Ray Walston, Morey Amsterdam, Jeff Wincott, Michael Ironside, Patrick Macnee, Abe Vigoda, Saul Rubinek, John Vernon, Keenan Wynn (who also previously appeared in the original 1963–1965 series), Chris Makepeace, Karen Kain, Vic Morrow, Andrew Prine, Lynda Day George, Nerene Virgin, Tedde Moore, Sammy Snyders, Henry Gibson (who also previously appeared in the original 1963–1965 series), John Carradine, Leslie Nielsen, Anne Francis, and Jayne Eastwood. Mike Myers appears as Tommy in episode 10 "Boy on Wheels".

Charles (Chuck) P. Eisenmann appeared as a dog trainer named Chuck in the first-season episode "Stand In" and as dog kennel operator named Mr. Charles in part one of the episode "Voyageurs" from the sixth season.

In a nod to the original series, the dog that appeared in this series was also credited as "London".

Plot
Plots ranged from the simple "dog-helps-person" stories to secret agent-type adventures.

In season 5's two-part episode "The Genesis Tapes" a scientist and a reporter theorized that Hobo was a type of superior canine. The reporter theorized that there was one dog and the scientist theorized that there were up to one hundred such dogs. The two-part episode had the scientist and reporter trying to capture Hobo to study him, with the reporter wanting a story and the scientist wanting to claim to be the first to discover the meta-canine as he put it. Both episodes feature flashback footage from the first five seasons of the series, with the first episode being the only episode of the revival series to include footage from the original 1960s series. At the end of the episode, Hobo found the evidence the reporter and scientist had collected and destroyed it, implying that Hobo did not want any evidence of his origins or nature becoming public.

Trainer Chuck Eisenmann used several dogs to play the role of "London" as he had selected dogs entirely based on their appearance. He determined which dogs to use for the scenes by making use of their abilities such as if one dog did not mind carrying objects or if one were small enough to safely jump through a car window and manoeuvre through the seats. In Eisenmann's book, A Dog's Day in Court, one of the dogs used in the 1970s series was London's grandson, who was also known as London.

A 2005 episode of the CTV sitcom Corner Gas, entitled "The Littlest Yarbo", pays tribute to the series by having a character (Hank Yarbo) convinced that a stray dog visiting the town is Hobo. The episode ends with a reprise of Terry Bush's "Maybe Tomorrow" theme song.

Theme music
The show's theme, "Maybe Tomorrow", was written by Terry Bush and John Crossen.  The original was sung by Terry Bush. In 2005, Bush commercially released the song on his debut album, entitled Maybe Tomorrow. The song was later used in a 2011 Dulux paint advertisement.  Additionally, in 2017, the song was in a Canada 150-themed Co-Op stores advertisement. A cover of the song, performed by Nightingale Cummings, was featured in season ten of the television show Trailer Park Boys.

Second series episodes

Telecast and home media

1963–1965 series
Following the 1958 film, the 1960s original TV series was aired in syndication around the world, including the UK on ITV, Australia on the Nine Network between 1964 and 1967 and New Zealand on TV One. Although the series was originally broadcast in black and white, it was in fact produced in colour. The VCI Entertainment DVD release of the series featured the colour versions of the episodes, except for the opening and closing credits which have only survived in black and white. Sixty-one episodes were broadcast over two seasons.

Storer Programs Incorporated, a unit of the now-defunct Storer Broadcasting, distributed the series to U.S. television stations during its 1960s run.

VCI Entertainment has released 12 episodes from the original series to DVD. The release features the colour versions of the first 3 episodes, except for the opening and closing sequences which have only survived in monochrome. The last 9 episodes were released in black and white.

1979–1985 series
The series aired on CTV on Thursday nights at 7:30p.m. Repeats continued on CTV, CTV 2, and other national networks up until 2012, when CTV replaced it with a block of music videos from Juicebox. However, CTV2 recently resumed reruns of the 80's incarnation. In the UK, the series premiered on the BBC on April 8, 1982, but only the first three seasons were shown and repeated until 1989. From April 1991 ITV picked up the series and each of the local companies played out the full series until late 1994.

Mediumrare Entertainment have only released the first two seasons of The Littlest Hobo on DVD. The Season One DVD, featured the theme tune "Maybe Tomorrow" on DVD in Region 2 & 4 on April 26, 2010.

In 2017, episodes from the series began to be uploaded onto Encore+, a YouTube channel run by the Canada Media Fund and Google Canada. The episodes have since been removed from the channel. As of 2023, the entire series is available on CTV's website through the CTV Throwback lineup, and reruns returns on Bell Media's channels: CTV, CTV 2, and Animal Planet.

References

External links
Canadian Communications Foundation: Littlest Hobo

 
 
 
 
 The Littlest Hobo song in Spanish
 Terry Bush's site. Theme song writer and vocalist on the 1979 series

1958 films
Films about dogs
Television shows about dogs
Fictional dogs
CTV Television Network original programming
1960s Canadian children's television series
1970s Canadian children's television series
1980s Canadian children's television series
1963 Canadian television series debuts
1965 Canadian television series endings
1979 Canadian television series debuts
1985 Canadian television series endings
Fictional hoboes
Television shows filmed in Vancouver
Television shows filmed in Toronto
Television series by 20th Century Fox Television
Television series by Glen-Warren Productions
1960s Canadian drama television series
1970s Canadian drama television series
1980s Canadian drama television series
1970s Canadian anthology television series
1980s Canadian anthology television series
1950s English-language films